The 2017–18 Departmental One Day Cup was a List A cricket tournament in Pakistan. The competition ran from 28 December 2017 to 14 January 2018. Habib Bank Limited were the defending champions. United Bank Limited won the tournament, beating Water and Power Development Authority by 6 wickets in the final.

Teams
The following teams are competing:

 Habib Bank Limited
 Khan Research Laboratories
 National Bank of Pakistan
 Pakistan Television
 Sui Northern Gas Pipelines Limited
 Sui Southern Gas Corporation
 United Bank Limited
 Water and Power Development Authority

Points table

 Teams qualified for the finals

Fixtures

Round 1

Round 2

Round 3

Round 4

Round 5

Round 6

Round 7

Finals

References

External links
 Series home at ESPN Cricinfo

2017 in Pakistani cricket
2018 in Pakistani cricket
Domestic cricket competitions in 2017–18
2017-18 Departmental One Day Cup